Monkey Junction is an unincorporated area near Wilmington in New Hanover County at the intersection of College Road (NC 132) and Carolina Beach Road (US 421). It is one of several centers of recent commercial and residential growth near Wilmington. In 2008, Wilmington began controversial efforts to annex the community, but in 2012, the annexation requests were overturned by the North Carolina General Assembly.

History
The intersection has been known as "Monkey Junction" for almost seventy years, due to a gas station that was located there from the late 1930s through the mid-1970s.  The station, run by Dina and Jack Spindle, kept live monkeys in order to attract customers from a bus that passed by on the way to and from Carolina Beach, which lies several miles south of the junction. The bus driver would stop near the station and announce "Monkey Junction".  Soldiers stationed at nearby Fort Fisher were also regular customers who enjoyed being entertained by the monkeys.

Non-natives can be readily identified as they refer to the locale as it appears on maps "Myrtle Grove Junction", a reference to the local residential neighborhood nearby.

References

External links

Unincorporated communities in North Carolina
Annexed places in North Carolina